Luntu Luntuni (Hispanicized spelling Lunto Luntune) is a mountain in the Andes of southern Peru, about  high. It is situated in the Puno Region, Lampa Province, Palca District, south-west of Palca.

References

Mountains of Peru
Mountains of Puno Region